Order for the International Merit of Blood is awarded by the International Federation of Blood Donor Organizations (IFBDO or FIODS) to personalities who made a special contribution to promote the regular, anonymous, voluntary, non-remunerated gift of blood in the world.

Proposals for award are sent to President who studies them and submits them to the Executive Council. According to IFBDO Rules of Procedure in force, except under exceptional circumstances, no more than four proposals per country can be submitted per meeting of the Executive Council.

See also 
 Blood Donation Badge of Honor

References

 
 
 
 
Civil awards and decorations
Blood donation